The Mini Challenge UK is a one-make race series began in 2002 and since 2020 it has run as a support package to the British Touring Car Championship.

Throughout the championship's history it established itself as one of the main routes into topline Touring Car racing, and drivers went on to do well in the Renault Clio Cup United Kingdom, British Touring Car Championship, World Touring Car Championship and British GT Championship. Past and current drivers such as Jeff Smith, Charlie Butler-Henderson, Harry Vaulkhard, Vicki Butler-Henderson, Brett Smith, Paul O'Neill, Nick Foster, Arthur Forster, Stewart Lines, Martin Depper, Chris Smiley and Ant Whorton-Eales.

The cars

Mini F56 (2015-Present)
Introduced in 2015 the F56 is the first purpose built race car to race in the championship, a 2 litre turbocharged BMW engine and a 6 speed sequential gearbox means that it is also the most powerful car in the championship with 275bhp.

Mini R56 (2010-Present)
Introduced in 2010 as the new JCW it has a 1.6 litre turbocharged BMW engine along with slick tyres and a 6 speed gearbox to produce 220bhp.

Mini R53 (2004-2010, 2016-Present)
Introduced in the third season the R53 has a 1.6 litre supercharged BMW engine producing 195bhp along with slick tyres and a 6 speed gearbox.

Mini R50 (2013-Present)
Introduced in 2013 as a replacement for the Cooper's with slick tyres, a 6 speed gearbox and a 1.6 litre BMW engine producing 135bhp.

Mini Cooper (2002-2012, 2017-Present)
Introduced in the first season the Cooper is the basic entry level car with treaded tyres and a 5 speed road gearbox along with an ordinary engine producing 120bhp.

The classes

Champions

References

External links

 
One-make series
Auto racing series in the United Kingdom